is a professional Japanese baseball player playing who has played for the Hiroshima Toyo Carp in Nippon Professional Baseball. After his short stint in NPB, he went on to play in the Shikoku Island League and the Baseball Challenge League.

External links

Living people
1979 births
Baseball people from Kagawa Prefecture
Japanese baseball players
Nippon Professional Baseball pitchers
Hiroshima Toyo Carp players